Kisan Sabha may refer to:

The Kisan Sabha (1919-1922)
The All India Kisan Sabha, begun in 1936